Yang Kuo (Chinese: 杨阔; born 8 January 1993 in Luoyang, Henan) is a Chinese football player who currently plays as a right-back or midfielder for Wuhan Three Towns.

Club career
Yang Kuo would start his professional football career in the 2011 league season for third tier club Shandong Youth. After two seasons he joined their affiliated club, Shandong Luneng in the 2013 Chinese Super League campaign. After a season with them he was allowed to leave and on 31 December 2013, Yang transferred to Chinese Super League side Henan Jianye.   He would eventually make his league debut for Henan on 13 April 2014 in a game against Guangzhou R&F,coming on as a substitute for Zhu Yifan in the 70th minute.

On 2 April 2021, Yang joined second tier club Wuhan Three Towns. In his debut season he would go on to establish himself as a vital member of the team and help aid the club to win the league title and gain promotion as the club entered the top tier for the first time in their history. The following campaign he would be part of the squad that won the 2022 Chinese Super League title.

Career statistics 
Statistics accurate as of match played 11 January 2023.

Honours

Club
Wuhan Three Towns
Chinese Super League: 2022.
China League One: 2021

References

External links
 

1993 births
Living people
Chinese footballers
Sportspeople from Luoyang
Footballers from Henan
Shandong Taishan F.C. players
Henan Songshan Longmen F.C. players
Chinese Super League players
China League Two players
Association football midfielders